Waterville Public Schools is a school district in Waterville, Maine.

Waterville was a part of Kennebec Valley Consolidated Schools (AOS92) until July 1, 2018.

Schools
 Waterville Senior High School
 Waterville Junior High School
 Albert S. Hall School
 George J. Mitchell School

Superintendent: Eric L. Haley
School Board Chair: Sara Sylvester

History
Waterville Schools were independent until 2007 when area school districts merged as required by law. Waterville became a member of AOS 92, along with Winslow and Vassalboro. In 2018, the district dissolved, and Waterville returned to an independent district.

References

External links
 Waterville Public Schools
School districts in Maine
Education in Kennebec County, Maine
School districts established in 2018